Vandelannoite is a surname. Notable people with the surname include:

Jason Vandelannoite (born 1986), Belgian footballer, brother of Jude
Jude Vandelannoite (born 1973), Belgian footballer